was a Japanese volleyball coach and a Japanese politician. He led Oriental Witches, nickname of "Nichibo Kaizuka", a factory volleyball team of Dai Nippon Spinning Co., Ltd. (later, Nichibo, thereafter, Unitika) in Kaizuka, Osaka given by the reports of European media when they achieved 24 consecutive victories against other national teams on the expedition to Europe, to world champion.

Biography
Hirofumi Daimatsu was born in Ayauta Gun, Kagawa Prefecture, Japan.

In 1941, he joined Dai Nippon Spinning Co., Ltd. (later, Nichibo, thereafter, Unitika) after he graduated from Kwansei Gakuin University.

Three months later, he was called up for military service and thrown into operation of Imphal named "Bleached bones road" after moving around China.　Second lieutenant Daimatsu's unit of 40 men was routed and had to cross mountains, having fevers of 40 because of malaria and/or amebic dysentery without food.

After World War II, in 1953 he became the coach for the factory women's volleyball team of Nichibo Kaizuka, namely Oriental Witches which started from a factory volleyball team located in Kaizuka City and evolved into the Japanese National Team.　Oriental Witches achieved 175 consecutive wins by Daimatsu's severe training, so he was called "Demon Daimatsu". As the coach of Japanese National Team, he led the Japanese Women's Team to a silver medal in the World Championship in 1960, a gold medal in the World Championship again in 1962 and a gold medal in Tokyo  Olympics in 1964.

In 1968, Daimatsu ran from Liberal Democratic Party and was elected as a member of the House of Councilors of the Diet.

In November 24, 1978, Hirofumi Daimatsu died.

In 2000, Hirofumi Daimatsu was inducted into the International Volleyball Hall of Fame.

Publications
『おれについてこい!』（Kodansha 1963）
『なせば成る』（Kodansha 1964）

See also
FIVB Volleyball Women's World Championship
Japan women's national volleyball team
Volleyball at the 1964 Summer Olympics
Volleyball Hall of Fame
Kurowashiki All Japan Volleyball Tournament

References

External links
Video of the moments of victory and of awarding gold medal in Tokyo Olympics, narrated in German
 Legendary gymnasium of the factory, Kaizuka City, Osaka, Now and Then / With photo and video narrated in Japanese / NHK

 

1921 births
1978 deaths
Sportspeople from Kagawa Prefecture
Volleyball coaches
National team coaches
Japanese military personnel of World War II